Thattantotam is a small town in Northern Province, Sri Lanka.

See also
List of towns in Northern Province, Sri Lanka

External links

Populated places in Northern Province, Sri Lanka